Murray Patrick Shanahan is a professor of Cognitive Robotics at Imperial College London, in the Department of Computing, and a senior scientist at DeepMind. He researches artificial intelligence, robotics, and cognitive science.

Education
Shanahan was educated at Imperial College London and completed his PhD at the University of Cambridge in 1987 supervised by William F. Clocksin.

Career and research
At Imperial College, in the Department of Computing, Shanahan was a postdoc from 1987 to 1991, an advanced research fellow until 1995. At Queen Mary & Westfield College, he was a senior research fellow from 1995 to 1998. Shanahan joined the Department of Electrical Engineering at Imperial, and then (in 2005) the Department of Computing, where he was promoted from Reader to Professor in 2006. Shanahan was a scientific advisor for Alex Garland's 2014 film Ex Machina. Garland credited Shanahan with correcting an error in Garland's initial scripts regarding the Turing test. Shanahan is on the external advisory board for the Cambridge Centre for the Study of Existential Risk. In 2016 Shanahan and his colleagues published a proof-of-concept for "Deep Symbolic Reinforcement Learning", a specific hybrid AI architecture that combines GOFAI with neural networks, and that exhibits a form of transfer learning. In 2017, citing "the potential (brain drain) on academia of the current tech hiring frenzy" as an issue of concern, Shanahan negotiated a joint position at Imperial College London and DeepMind. The Atlantic and Wired UK have characterized Shanahan as an influential researcher.

Books
In 2010, Shanahan published Embodiment and the inner life: Cognition and Consciousness in the Space of Possible Minds, a book that helped inspire the 2014 film Ex Machina. The book argues that cognition revolves around a process of "inner rehearsal" by an embodied entity working to predict the consequences of its physical actions.

In 2015, Shanahan published The Technological Singularity, which runs through various scenarios following the invention of an artificial intelligence that makes better versions of itself and rapidly outcompetes humans. The book aims to be an evenhanded primer on the issues surrounding superhuman intelligence. Shanahan takes the view that we do not know how superintelligences will behave: whether they will be friendly or hostile, predictable or inscrutable.

Shanahan also authored Solving the Frame Problem (MIT Press, 1997) and co-authored Search, Inference and Dependencies in Artificial Intelligence (Ellis Horwood, 1989).

Views
As of the 2020s, Shanahan characterizes AI as lacking the common sense of a human child. He endorses research into artificial general intelligence (AGI) to fix this problem, stating that AI systems deployed in areas such as medical diagnosis and automated vehicles should have such abilities to be safer and more effective. Shanahan states that there is no need to panic about an AI takeover because multiple conceptual breakthroughs will be needed for AGI, and that "it is impossible to know when (AGI) might be achievable". He later stated an "unknown number of conceptual breakthroughs are needed" for the development of AGI. Shanahan states "The AI community does not think it's a substantial worry, whereas the public does think it's much more of an issue. The right place to be is probably in-between those two extremes." In 2014 Shanahan argued that "it's probably a good idea for AI researchers to start thinking (now) about the (existential risk) issues that Stephen Hawking and others have raised."

References

External links
 A two-minute lecture on AI by Shanahan (BBC, 2014)
 Presentation on AI at the University of Dublin (2018)

Living people
Artificial intelligence researchers
Academics of the Department of Computing, Imperial College London
Year of birth missing (living people)